The Multan Heavy Water Production Facility is a small heavy water production plant, located in Multan, Punjab, Pakistan, with an original annual capacity of 13 metric tons. Equipment for the plant was partly obtained from Belgium in 1980.

Official information about Multan is classified and not available to the public and media. What is publicly known is based on intelligence reports published by various intelligence agencies. The Multan facility, like some but not all other nuclear facilities in Pakistan, is not subject to International Atomic Energy Agency inspection. Security of the site and its inventory is professed by the Pakistani government.

Historical background

In 1960, then Pakistan Atomic Energy Commission (PAEC) chairman Dr. Nazir Ahmed made a proposal to the chairman of Pakistan Industrial Development Corporation (PIDC) for the construction of a heavy water plant with production capacity of 50 kg of heavy water per day at Multan, in conjunction with a planned fertilizer factory. However, the PIDC did not immediately act on the PAEC's proposal.

Dr. Ishrat Hussain Usmani was head of the PAEC when construction of the plant began. The plant was constructed indigenously by PAEC and financed by Pak Arab Fertilizer (PAF). Construction of the plant began in 1962. Investment finance was provided by PAF during the 1960s. The plant was expanded in 1978. Project management was headed by PAEC chairman Munir Ahmad Khan. Two further plants were designed and constructed under the guidance of Munir Ahmad Khan.

Fertilizer plant 

The largest installation on the site is a fertilizer factory with an annual output capacity of between 140,000 and 117,000 tons of ammonium nitrate, while a smaller fertilizer plant has an annual output capacity of 43,000 tons of urea. In 1998, the Government of Pakistan decided to privatize PAF, which had previously been managed by the National Fertilizer Corporation (NFC). The Agriculture Engineering Institution was at the time affiliated with PAF.

External links 

 Multan Heavy Water Plant

Nuclear power stations in Pakistan
Heavy Water
Nuclear history of Pakistan
Nuclear technology in Pakistan
Government of Zulfikar Ali Bhutto
Belgium–Pakistan relations